Prawat (via ) is a masculine given name. Notable men with the given name include:

Prawat Nagvajara (born 1958), Thai academic and cross-country skier
Prawat Wahoram (born 1981), Thai wheelchair racer

Thai masculine given names